José "Pepe" Bordalás Jiménez (born 5 March 1964) is a Spanish former footballer who played as a striker, currently a manager.

His playing career ended due to injury without a first-team appearance for Hércules, and he made his professional managerial debut for the same team in Segunda División in 2006. He won promotion from that division with Alavés and Getafe in successive seasons, also leading the latter to a best-ever La Liga finish of fifth in 2019.

Playing career
Bordalás was born in Alicante, Valencian Community. During his career, he never played higher than the Tercera División and the regional championships; he was under contract with Hércules CF for seven years but never appeared officially for the club, being loaned five times which included a three-season spell with neighbouring Benidorm CF.

Released in 1988, Bordalás subsequently represented CD Dénia, FC Torrevieja, UD Petrelense CF, UD Español San Vicente and UD Altea, retiring from football at only 28 due to injury.

Coaching career

Early years
Bordalás worked exclusively in his region of birth for 19 years, his first job being at Alicante CF's reserves in 1993. The following year, he was appointed at the main squad.

After three years with as many teams, Bordalás returned to Alicante in 1998, taking them from the regional leagues to Segunda División B in only three seasons. His first experience in the Segunda División arrived with former club Hércules, replacing fired Juan Carlos Mandiá midway through 2005–06 and being sacked himself only seven games into the following campaign.

Bordalás returned to division three in 2007–08 with CD Alcoyano, leading the side to the first position in the following season and the subsequent failure in the promotion playoffs. In early October 2009 he terminated his contract amicably, signing with Elche CF of the second tier.

Alavés
After two spells at AD Alcorcón, Bordalás was named Deportivo Alavés manager on 11 June 2015. He led the team back to La Liga after ten years in his first season, as champions, but was still relieved of his duties on 21 June 2016.

Getafe

Bordalás was hired by Getafe CF in September 2016, replacing the dismissed Juan Esnáider on a deal until the end of the campaign. He again won promotion to the top flight, this time by a 3–2 aggregate victory over CD Tenerife in the playoff final the following June. Following an eighth-place finish in his first season at that level, he led the Community of Madrid team to a best-ever fifth position and only missed qualification for the UEFA Champions League on the last matchday in May 2019; he earned the Miguel Muñoz Trophy for best coach for this feat.

Valencia
Bordalás was appointed head coach of Valencia CF in May 2021, signing a two-year contract. On his debut on 13 August, his team won 1–0 against his previous employer. In his first season, the team reached the final of the Copa del Rey, where they lost on penalties to Real Betis.

On 3 June 2022, days after the sacking of chairman Anil Murthy, Valencia's owner Peter Lim announced that manager Bordalás would also be released, with Italian Gennaro Gattuso being brought in as replacement.

Personal life
Bordalás' cousin, Juan Ignacio Martínez, is also a football coach.

Managerial statistics

Honours

Manager
Alavés
Segunda División: 2015–16

Individual
Miguel Muñoz Trophy: 2018–19
UEFA La Liga Coach of the Year: 2018–19

References

External links

1964 births
Living people
Spanish footballers
Footballers from Alicante
Association football forwards
Tercera División players
Divisiones Regionales de Fútbol players
Hércules CF players
Orihuela Deportiva CF footballers
Villajoyosa CF footballers
Benidorm CF footballers
CD Torrevieja players
Spanish football managers
La Liga managers
Segunda División managers
Segunda División B managers
Tercera División managers
Alicante CF managers
CD Eldense managers
Hércules CF managers
CD Alcoyano managers
Elche CF managers
AD Alcorcón managers
Deportivo Alavés managers
Getafe CF managers
Valencia CF managers